Tomas Gomez (born May 20, 1993) is an American professional soccer player who plays as a goalkeeper for Major League Soccer club Real Salt Lake and MLS Next Pro side Real Monarchs.

Career

College and amateur
Gomez played four years of college soccer at Georgetown University between 2011 and 2014.

Gomez also played with Orlando City U-23 in 2013 to 2014.

Professional
On January 20, 2015, Gomez was selected in the third round (60th overall) of the 2015 MLS SuperDraft by Columbus Crew. He wasn't signed by Columbus, instead joining San Jose Earthquakes on March 26, 2015.

After his release from San Jose, Gomez signed with United Soccer League side Rochester Rhinos in March 2016.

After spells with Saint Louis FC and Pittsburgh Riverhounds, Gomez joined USL Championship side Sacramento Republic in January 2021. Gomez was released by Sacramento following the 2021 season.

In February 2022, Gomez joined MLS Next Pro club Real Monarchs. He was named to the bench for the club's parent team, Real Salt Lake, on February 27, 2022 in a fixture against Houston Dynamo.

References

External links

1993 births
Living people
American soccer players
United States men's youth international soccer players
Mexican footballers
American sportspeople of Mexican descent
Mexican emigrants to the United States
Georgetown Hoyas men's soccer players
Orlando City U-23 players
San Jose Earthquakes players
Real Monarchs players
Real Salt Lake players
Rochester New York FC players
Sacramento Republic FC players
Saint Louis FC players
Soccer players from Missouri
Sportspeople from St. Louis County, Missouri
Columbus Crew draft picks
USL League Two players
USL Championship players
People from Webster Groves, Missouri
Association football goalkeepers